Cortodera subpilosa, the western mountain flower longhorn, is a species of flower long-horned beetle in the family Cerambycidae. It is found in the northwestern United States and southwestern Canada. Adults are dark brown to black, 7 to 13 mm in size, and are covered with fine hair.

References

Further reading

 
 

Lepturinae
Articles created by Qbugbot
Beetles described in 1850